Grapes of Wrath is the first studio album by Spear of Destiny, released by Epic Records in 1983 (see 1983 in music). The band's first single was "Flying Scotsman" followed by the second single "The Wheel".

Track listing
All songs written by Kirk Brandon

Side one
 "The Wheel" - 3:10
 "Flying Scotsman" - 3:20
 "Roof of the World" - 3:02
 "Aria" - 4:38
 "Solution" - 3:56
Side two
 "The Murder of Love" - 3:12
 "The Preacher" - 2:34
 "Omen of the Times" - 3:15
 "The Man Who Tunes the Drums" - 2:47
 "Grapes of Wrath" - 4:44

A 'Special Cassette Mix' version of the album was also released. It comprises (in track-listed order):

A1 "The Wheel"
A2 "Flying Scotsman" (12" Version)
A3 "Roof of the World"
A4 "Aria"
A5 "Solution" (preceded by a brief guitar version of The Third Man Theme bridging from A4)
B1 "The Preacher" (including a vocal-only intro of the entire song)
B2 "The Murder of Love" (sans finger-clicking intro)
B3 "Omen of the Times" (preceded by an air raid siren bridging from B2)
B4 "The Man Who Tunes the Drums"
B5 "Grapes of Wrath"

Personnel
Spear of Destiny
Kirk Brandon - vocals, guitar
Stan Stammers - bass guitar
Lascelles James - saxophone, flute
Chris Bell - drums
with:
The Sisters - backing vocals on "Flying Scotsman" and "Roof of the World"
Technical
Nick Launay - engineer, mixing
Gavin MacKillop - assistant engineer
Pierre Boucher - front cover photography
"Thanks to The Sisters. Special Thanks to Trevor Ravenscroft".

References

1983 debut albums
Spear of Destiny (band) albums
Albums produced by Nick Launay
Epic Records albums